Ibrahim Posle Conteh (born 2 November 1996) is a Sierra Leonean professional footballer who plays as a midfielder for Charlotte Independence in USL League One. Conteh joined USL League One club Charlotte Independence on August 4, 2022.

International career
In 2014, Conteh played with the Sierra Leone national under-20 team scoring one goal in four games. He made his debut for the senior team in a 1-0 win over Liberia on 8 September 2019, playing 90 minutes in the 2022 FIFA World Cup qualification.

References

External links

1989 births
Living people
Sierra Leonean footballers
Sierra Leone international footballers
Association football midfielders
PSIS Semarang players
PS TIRA players
PS Barito Putera players
Pelita Bandung Raya players
Detroit City FC players
Sierra Leonean expatriate footballers
Expatriate footballers in Indonesia
F.C. Kallon players
Persipura Jayapura players
Sierra Leonean expatriate sportspeople in Indonesia
Sierra Leonean expatriate sportspeople in the United States
Expatriate footballers in Bahrain
Expatriate soccer players in the United States
National Independent Soccer Association players
Charlotte Independence players